William Tucker Boner (born March 16, 1993), known online as Jericho or IIJERiiCHOII, is an American YouTuber and Twitch streamer. His last name originates from his ancestors hailing from the town of Bonn, Germany. The original German name, meaning "One from Bonn", was anglicized and resulted in the surname Boner.

He has over 1.26 million subscribers on YouTube and over 1.2 million followers on Twitch as of April 2021.

Career 
Boner started to upload gaming videos and skits on YouTube during his high school years in 2009. He joined Ustream in 2011 and later moved to Twitch. 

Boner graduated from the Friends School of Baltimore in 2011. After failing to get into The University of North Carolina, he enrolled in The University of North Carolina Wilmington. Boner thought that college was preventing him from making content, which influenced his decision to drop out and move to Los Angeles with other YouTubers (GoldGlove, TmarTn, Syndicate, MuzzaFuzza), known collectively as the Gamershore. He took classes at a community college in Los Angeles, but eventually became a YouTuber and Twitch streamer full time.

Boner is the co-founder of The Race, which was a regular fundraising livestream event, helping the charity program of the Call of Duty Endowment foundation.

Boner and a fellow streamer Tom Cassell are the creators of the Minecraft multiplayer series titled Mianite, which was released in May 2014. They later partnered up with Jordan Maron and Sonja Reid as the four main characters of the series. Mianite was renewed for a second season in 2015, which was the end of the original run of the series. Cassell continued the series with other YouTubers including Maron under the name Mianiatian Isles in 2020, with Boner declining to return to the project.

Occasionally Boner participates in esports tournaments for Counter-Strike: Global Offensive and Player Unknown's Battlegrounds. His top esports achievement was winning the Jack Ryan CS:GO Invitational Tournament in 2018. Boner has competed in other events such as Twitch Rivals, and Counter-Strike: Global Offensive matches as a stand-in for the North American esports team Mythic.

On November 29, 2019, Boner, along with Daniel Goudie of Disciple Records, launched the record label "NightMode". The label's first single is "Everything You Need" by Unlike Pluto. The label has released new singles on a seasonal basis, and has created some collaboration projects, including "This Is Cyberpunk" intended to be a simultaneous release with the video game Cyberpunk 2077.

Recognition 
In 2018 he was listed on the Forbess "30 Under 30" list in the gaming category.

References

External links 

 
 

American YouTubers
Twitch (service) streamers
Gaming YouTubers
Video game commentators
1993 births
Living people